Eduardo Andrés Maglioni (born 14 April 1946, in Reconquista) is an Argentine football striker who won three copa Libertadores with Club Atlético Independiente and scored the fastest recorded hat-trick in the history of Argentine football.

Maglioni began playing with local side Sarmiento de Resistencia. In 1969, he joined Independiente, where he was part of two league and three Copa Libertadores winning teams. He made over 150 appearances for the club in all competitions and scored 60 goals.

On 18 March 1973 Maglioni scored a hat-trick against Gimnasia y Esgrima de La Plata in less than one minute fifty one seconds.

Maglioni also played for  Club Atlético Huracán in 1974

Titles
Independiente

Copa Intercontinental (1): Copa Intercontinental 1973
Copa Libertadores (3): 1972, 1973, 1974
Primera División Argentina (2): Metropolitano 1970 Metropolitano 1971
Copa Interamericana (1): 1972

References

External links
 BDFA profile

1946 births
Living people
People from Reconquista, Santa Fe
Argentine footballers
Association football forwards
Club Atlético Independiente footballers
Club Atlético Huracán footballers
Argentine Primera División players
Association football midfielders
Sportspeople from Santa Fe Province